Jákup Ludvig Thomsen (born 23 November 1997) is a Faroese footballer who plays as a centre-forward for HB Tórshavn.

International career
Thomsen made his international debut for the Faroe Islands on 17 November 2018, coming on as a substitute in the 63rd minute for Klæmint Olsen in the 2018–19 UEFA Nations League D match against Azerbaijan, which finished as a 0–2 away loss. He scored his first goal for the national team on 23 March 2019 in a 1–2 away loss to Malta in the UEFA Euro 2020 qualifying.

Career statistics

International

International goals

References

External links
 
 
 

1997 births
Living people
Faroese footballers
Faroe Islands youth international footballers
Faroe Islands under-21 international footballers
Faroe Islands international footballers
Faroese expatriate footballers
Expatriate men's footballers in Denmark
Faroese expatriate sportspeople in Iceland
Expatriate footballers in Iceland
Association football forwards
FC Midtjylland players
Ikast FS players
Skive IK players
Thisted FC players
Fimleikafélag Hafnarfjarðar players
Danish 1st Division players
Úrvalsdeild karla (football) players